The 2017 MSBL season was the 29th season of the Men's State Basketball League (SBL). The regular season began on Friday 17 March, with round 1 seeing a 2016 grand final rematch between the Cockburn Cougars and Joondalup Wolves. The 2017 MSBL All-Star Game was played on 5 June at Bendat Basketball Centre – the home of basketball in Western Australia. The regular season ended on Saturday 29 July. The finals began on Saturday 5 August and ended on Saturday 2 September, when the Perth Redbacks defeated the Wolves in the MSBL Grand Final.

Regular season
The regular season began on Friday 17 March and ended on Saturday 29 July after 20 rounds of competition. In an exciting move by the SBL, all games over the Easter Weekend were played on a blockbuster Thursday night with six venues all hosting games before the league took a break for the Easter long weekend. Anzac Round took place again in round 6 of the competition with the Kalamunda Eastern Suns and Willetton Tigers continuing their Anzac Day game tradition while being joined this year by the Cockburn Cougars hosting the Rockingham Flames on the Tuesday afternoon. There was also Women's Round in round 9, Rivalry Round in round 12, and Heritage Round in round 16.

Standings

Finals
The finals began on Saturday 5 August and ended on Saturday 2 September with the MSBL Grand Final.

Bracket

All-Star Game
The 2017 MSBL All-Star Game took place at Bendat Basketball Centre on Monday 5 June, with all proceeds going to Lifeline WA for suicide prevention.

Rosters

Game data

Awards

Player of the Week

Statistics leaders

Regular season
 Most Valuable Player: Jacob Holmen (Goldfields Giants)
 Coach of the Year: Charles Nix (South West Slammers)
 Most Improved Player: Corey Shervill (Lakeside Lightning)
 All-Star Five:
 PG: Tre Nichols (South West Slammers)
 SG: Dwayne Benjamin (Geraldton Buccaneers)
 SF: Brian Voelkel (South West Slammers)
 PF: Shawn Redhage (Perth Redbacks)
 C: Ray Turner (Willetton Tigers)
 All-Defensive Five:
 PG: Kyle Armour (Willetton Tigers)
 SG: Courtney Belger (Kalamunda Eastern Suns)
 SF: Maurice Barrow (Geraldton Buccaneers)
 PF: Ben Purser (Perry Lakes Hawks)
 C: Kevin Davis (Joondalup Wolves)

Finals
 Grand Final MVP: Lee Roberts (Perth Redbacks)

References

External links
 2017 fixtures
 2017 season preview
 2017 MSBL All-Star teams
 State basketball a first for Northam
 SBL Quarter Finals Schedule Released
 MSBL Grand Final preview
 SBL grand final: Perth Redbacks take comprehensive title

2017
2016–17 in Australian basketball
2017–18 in Australian basketball